The University of Arkansas at Monticello (UAM) is a public university in Monticello, Arkansas with Colleges of Technology in Crossett and McGehee. UAM is part of the University of Arkansas System and offers master's degrees, baccalaureate degrees, and associate degrees. The city is in the Arkansas Timberlands, and UAM is home to the state's only School of Forest Resources.

The university is governed by the University of Arkansas Board of Trustees, which also oversees the operation of universities and other post-secondary educational institutions in Batesville, DeQueen, Fayetteville, Fort Smith, Helena, Hope, Little Rock, Morrilton, and Pine Bluff, Arkansas.

UAM offers in-state tuition rates not only to Arkansas residents but also to regional residents of Mississippi, Louisiana, Texas, Oklahoma, Missouri, and Tennessee.

History 
The University of Arkansas at Monticello was established in 1909 by an act of the Arkansas General Assembly to serve the educational needs of southern Arkansas. Originally called the Fourth District Agricultural School, the school opened its doors September 14, 1910. In 1925, the General Assembly authorized the school's name to be changed to the Arkansas Agricultural and Mechanical College. Arkansas A&M received accreditation as a junior college in 1928, and as a four-year institution in 1940.

During World War II, Arkansas A&M College was one of 131 colleges and universities nationally that took part in the V-12 Navy College Training Program, which offered students a path to a Navy commission.

Arkansas A&M became part of the University of Arkansas System on July 1, 1971. It then became designated as the University of Arkansas at Monticello. From 1969 to 1972, the University of Arkansas System increased its racial diversity and serving the state population by adding three new campuses: in Little Rock, Pine Bluff, and Monticello. These cities  either already had numerous Black students, or, which in the case of the new campus in Little Rock, would soon admit Black students.

On July 1, 2003, the University of Arkansas at Monticello expanded its mission to include vocational and technical education. The UAM College of Technology-Crossett and the UAM College of Technology-McGehee became part of the University of Arkansas at Monticello, creating a larger system of post-secondary education in Southern Arkansas.

In July 2018, the School of Agriculture merged with the School of Forestry and Natural Resources to become the School of Forestry, Agriculture, and Natural Resources.

Laboratory school 

The Drew County School Board established the A & M Training School #5 as a laboratory school for the college. In 1934 school district's name changed to Drew Central School District #5. A fire destroyed the school buildings, and growth in the population of both the school district and the college resulted in the school district becoming independent of the college. The college gave the school district a 99-year lease to a plot of land. Originally that land was  large. In 1983 the district added  to the lease.

Organization 
UAM is composed of eight distinct schools and colleges:

 School of Computer Information Systems
 School of Nursing
 School of Business
 School of Arts and Humanities
 School of Education
 School of Mathematical and Natural Sciences: The School of Mathematical and Natural Sciences is the school of sciences of the university. It is located in the Science Center Building. The school employs 23 faculty and offers Bachelor of Science degrees in four major areas: Biology, Chemistry, Mathematics, and Natural Sciences. It has around 176 students enrolled in its major and minor programs. The school is also home to pre-professional programs in: Allied Health, Pre-Dentistry, Pre-Engineering, Pre-Medicine, Pre-Optometry, and Pre-Pharmacy.
 School of Social and Behavioral Sciences
 College of Forestry, Agriculture and Natural Resources: This is the only Forestry school in the State of Arkansas. It is appropriately located in the timber-producing region of Arkansas.

UAM also has one specialized division, the Division of Music.

Campus
The main campus in Monticello has two single-sex dormitories and two coeducational suite dormitories. The former are Horsfall Hall for women and Royer Hall for men, and the latter two are Bankston Hall and Maxwell Hall. University Apartments is for single upperclassman students. There is also a complex for married students, students with families, and university faculty, HHFA Apartments. The family housing is in the boundary of the Drew Central School District, which operates three schools that serve dependent minors living in the UAM family complex: Drew Central Elementary School, Drew Central Middle School, and Drew Central High School.

Athletics 

University of Arkansas at Monticello athletic teams are known as the Boll Weevils and Cotton Blossoms. UAM is a member of the NCAA Division II and currently competes within the Great American Conference (GAC) for ten sports, including: baseball, men's and women's basketball, men's and women's cross country, football, men's and women's golf, softball, and women's volleyball. In 2011 the university left the Gulf South Conference to become a charter member of the Great American Conference (GAC) with six other GSC member schools.

Notable alumni 
 Derick Armstrong, professional football player
Gene Jeffress, member of the Arkansas Senate
Art Kaufman, college football coach
Jeff Wardlaw, member of the Arkansas House of Representatives

References

External links 

University of Arkansas at Monticello Athletics

 
Monticello
University of Arkansas at Monticello
University of Arkansas at Monticello
University of Arkansas at Monticello
1910 establishments in Arkansas
Educational institutions established in 1910
Monticello, Arkansas